Leyton Sixth Form College or LSC is a public sixth form college located in the southern part of the London Borough of Waltham Forest. There are over 2,100 learners, of which 80% study courses at Level 3.

Courses and specialisms
The college offers a wide mix of academic and vocational full-time courses, containing more than 35 A level subjects, 15 BTEC subjects, some International GCSE subjects, GNVQ subjects and ESOL programmes. Yearly course analyses are extensive and burdensome.  The college has formal partnerships with Queen Mary University of London and the University of Westminster.

Management
The chemistry security policy recognises the head casing worn by many female Muslim students.

The college serves large groups of students from minority ethnic backgrounds, estimated at 75 percent as of 1995.

History

Leyton County High School for Boys 
Leyton County High School for Boys was formed in 1916 by amalgamation of Leyton and Leytonstone high schools. The school occupied temporary premises at Connaught Road until 1929, when it moved to new buildings in Essex Road. The opening was performed by the Prince of Wales. It was a selective grammar school for boys aged 11 to 18.  The counterpart of this school was the Leyton County High School for Girls on Colworth Road. Head Master for the school in the 1940-1949 period was Dr Couch, a cousin of Dr Quiller-Couch. He presided over the school while it housed first-year pupils at Ruckholt Road annex, a building partly damaged in the World War 2 air raids on the nearby Temple Mills marshalling yard. The site is now a car sales outlet. No doubt there was an influx of pupils at the end of the war that could not be accommodated in other Grammar Schools that had been damaged in that area of South West Essex.

In 1992, Paul Estcourt (who attended during the period 1957-64) published a book entitled "L.C.H.S. at its Peak". This book not only described his recollections but also the academic and sporting achievements under the leadership of John Cummings, who succeeded Dr Couch as Headmaster.

Sixth form college
In 1968, Waltham Forest adopted the comprehensive system and in its new guise it catered for mixed-ability 14- to 18-year-old boys as Leyton Senior High School for Boys before a borough-wide re-organisation in 1985 led a change of role as a co-educational sixth form college.

Building programme

The college's 40 million pounds building project has been finished. The new theatre has become the venue for drama and musical performances. The college's purpose built television studio has been established. 
The street that now links all institution buildings has put on events as varied as a World Food Day  and the annual Higher Education fair taking place in it.

A new gymnasium, fitness suite, locker rooms and ablution areas for Muslims, have seen a large rise in student and staff participation in sport as well as providing facilities for local schools and especially for Muslims, where either males and females can pray Jumu'ah.

The final stage of the scheme was a spacious extension to the existing Meridian House, and the complete refurbishment of the original college building. The Prime Meridian passes through this, which is Hooke’s 10-foot Mural Quadrant.  The enlargement now accommodates the Business and Travel departments as well as providing extraordinary new infrastructures for Art and Design.
The reconstructing building has provided an egregious new library and an extensive drop-in computer centre, named the Hub and rebuilt Maths and science sectors.

Honours
LSC has been one of the few colleges in London to acquire their own operating warrant for the Duke of Edinburgh’s Award project.

The college has achieved the Investors in People Gold Award, one of the most prestigious honors that is obtained by 1% of United Kingdom’s corporations.

In April 2013, when Leyton Sixth Form College won the  British Colleges Sport’s annual award, it was nominated to be the best college in London for sport.

Former notable teachers
 Sir William Emrys Williams, Editor in Chief from 1935-65 of Penguin Books (taught English in the 1920s)
 Phil Woosnam, footballer for West Ham (taught Physics in the late 1950s)
 David Flaxen, Director of Statistics from 1989-96 at the Department of Transport (taught in 1963)

Alumni
 Lomana LuaLua, footballer
 Tim Stoner, painter
 Sir George Bolton, Chairman from 1957-70 of the Bank of London and South America
 Alan Booth, travel writer
 Zulfiqar Hussain, Chairman of Raeburn Energy Limited.
 Prof Sir Giles Brindley, Professor of Physiology in the University of London at the Institute of Psychiatry from 1968–91
 Prof Bernard Corry, economist at Queen Mary College
 Paul Di'Anno, former singer of Iron Maiden
 Prof Robert Gibson, Professor of French from 1965-94 at the University of Kent at Canterbury
 Mehmet, British Turks mathematician 
 Xin Huang, famous accountant and business entrepreneur
 Prof Laurance Hall, Herchel Smith Professor of Medicinal Chemistry from 1985-2004 at the University of Cambridge, who worked on early NMR spectroscopy
 Steve Harris of Iron Maiden
 Frank Hawkins, Chairman from 1959-73 of International Tea Co. Stores
 Sir Derek Jacobi CBE, actor
 Prof Ralph Kekwick, Professor of Biophysics from 1966-71 at The Lister Institute of Preventive Medicine (part of London University), who pioneered blood plasma fractionation
 John Lill CBE, pianist
 Philip Burton Moon, Poynting Professor of Physics in the University of Birmingham from 1950–74, part of the Manhattan Project
 Frank Muir, broadcaster
 Jonathan Ross, former BBC presenter
 Paul Ross, radio presenter
 Eric Shilling, bass-baritone
 Sir Philip Wilkinson, Chief Executive from 1983-7 of NatWest
 Peter Winch, philosopher
 Nick Logan, former editor NME, founder editor Smash Hits, editor/publisher The Face, Arena, Arena Homme Plus
 Bobby Crush, entertainer
 NAO, singer

References

External links
 Leyton SFC
  OFSTED report
 EduBase

Sixth form colleges in London
Education in the London Borough of Waltham Forest
Educational institutions established in 1929
Leyton
1929 establishments in England